Richard Jackson is a biochemist and cell biologist. He is Emeritus Professor of RNA Biochemistry in the Department of Biochemistry at the University of Cambridge. In 2006, Jackson was elected a Fellow of the Royal Society. Jackson's main contributions to cell biology concern the translation of a cell's genetic instruction by ribosomes into proteins, utilizing messenger RNA.

References 

Academics of the University of Cambridge
Fellows of the Royal Society
Living people
British biochemists
Cell biologists
Year of birth missing (living people)